The  2002–03 Belarusian Extraliga season was the 11th season of the Belarusian Extraliga, the top level of ice hockey in Belarus. Eight teams participated in the league, and HK Gomel won the championship.

Regular season

Playoffs
Semifinals
HK Gomel - HK Neman Grodno 3-0 on series
HK Keramin Minsk - HK Khimvolokno Mogilev 3-1 on series
Final
HK Gomel - HK Keramin Minsk 3-0 on series
3rd place
HK Khimvolokno Mogilev - HK Neman Grodno 2-1 on series

External links 
 Season on hockeyarchives.info

Belarusian Extraleague
Belarusian Extraleague seasons
Extra